Kim Tae-ri (born April 24, 1990) is a South Korean actress. She is known for starring in the films The Handmaiden (2016), Little Forest (2018), Space Sweepers (2020), as well as the TV series Mr. Sunshine (2018), and Twenty-Five Twenty-One (2022). The latter role won her the Best Actress Award for Television at the 58th Baeksang Arts Awards.

Early life
Kim Tae-ri was born on April 24, 1990, in Seoul. After graduating from Youngshin Nursing Business High School, Kim studied Journalism and Communication at Kyung Hee University from 2008 to 2012. Kim was inspired to become an actress in her second year of college after joining a college theater club.

Career

2012–2015: Early career 
After graduating from college, Kim worked for a year as a member of the technical crew of a theatre troupe in Daehakro. Later, Kim was cast as a standby in the 2012 production of Spoonface Steinberg but did not get to perform on stage. She subsequently acted in the plays Pansy and To ask about love, and was cast for the rerun of Spoonface Steinberg in 2013. In the same year, she filmed Moon Young, a short film which debuted at the Seoul Independent Film Festival in 2015; a theatrical version was released in 2017. In 2014, Kim joined J-Wide Company and appeared in a number of TV commercials. During this period, she acted in several short films and attended many auditions for film roles but faced multiple rejections.

2016–present: Feature debut and high-profile roles 

In 2016, Kim made her feature film debut in Park Chan-wook's The Handmaiden, where she was chosen from 1,500 actresses who auditioned for the role. For her performance in the film, she won the award for Best New Actress at the Blue Dragon Film Awards, Director's Cut Awards, Buil Film Awards, and Busan Film Critics Awards. Park recounted his first impression of Kim reminded him strongly of his first meeting with actress Kang Hye-jung, who had her career breakthrough in Park's 2003 film Oldboy.

In 2017, Kim was part of the ensemble cast in the political thriller 1987: When the Day Comes, which garnered her a nomination for Best Actress at the Grand Bell Awards.

In 2018, Kim headlined the Korean film adaptation of the manga series Little Forest alongside Ryu Jun-yeol and Jin Ki-joo, for which she won the Director's Cut Award and received nominations for the Blue Dragon Film Award, Baeksang Arts Award and Buil Film Award, all for Best Actress. In the same year, Kim made her small-screen debut in the period melodrama Mr. Sunshine, written by Kim Eun-sook, and she was nominated for the Baeksang Arts Award for Best Actress for her performance. Mr. Sunshine became the sixth-highest-rated drama in Korean cable television history. In 2019, Kim was ranked among Forbes 30 Under 30 in the Entertainment & Sports category.

In 2021, Kim starred in the first Korean space blockbuster Space Sweepers alongside Song Joong-ki. Originally slated for a July 2020 premiere which was cancelled due to COVID-19, the film was released on Netflix in February 2021. The film debuted at No. 1 on Netflix in at least 16 countries and gathered more than 26 million household viewers on Netflix during the first 28 days of its release. In August 2021, Kim moved to Management MMM after her contract with J-Wide expired.

In 2022, Kim starred in the tvN coming-of-age drama Twenty-Five Twenty-One with Nam Joo-hyuk making her comeback to the small-screen in four years since 2018. The series was a commercial success and became one of the highest-rated dramas in Korean cable television history. For her portrayal of Na Hee-do in the drama, she won both Best Actress – Television and Most Popular Actress at 58th Baeksang Arts Awards.

The same year, she starred in Choi Dong-hoon's sci-fi crime film Alienoid. To prepare for her role as Lee Ahn, Kim attended action school and learned martial arts, shooting and gymnastics.

Endorsements
Since 2017, Kim was selected as brand ambassador for South Korean high-end cosmetics brand O Hui. 

Since 2018, she became the face of Kenzo’s signature fragrance, Flower By Kenzo. 

She was selected as brand ambassador for French-owned American luxury jewelry house Tiffany & Co. between 2018 and 2021. In September 2021, she introduced herself as a brand ambassador on a video about Prada’s Spring-Summer 2022 collection live show. On January 25, 2022, the women’s fashion brand itMICHAA announced her selection as their new muse.

Filmography

Film

Television series

Music video appearances

Theater

Discography

Singles

Awards and nominations

State honors

Listicles

Notes

References

External links

 Kim Tae-ri at J-Wide Company 
 
 
 

1990 births
Living people
South Korean television actresses
South Korean film actresses
21st-century South Korean actresses
Actresses from Seoul
Kyung Hee University alumni
Best Newcomer Asian Film Award winners
Best Actress Paeksang Arts Award (television) winners